Salomėja is a Lithuanian feminine given name. People bearing the name Salomėja include:
 Salomėja Nėris (1904–1945), Lithuanian poet
 Salomėja Stakauskaitė (1890–1971), Lithuanian educator and politician
 Salomėja Zaksaitė (born 1985), Lithuanian chess player

References

Lithuanian feminine given names